The North American XSN2J-1, also known by the company designation NA-142, was developed for the United States Navy by North American Aviation as a replacement for the SNJ Texan as an advanced scout-trainer. Designed in competition with the Fairchild XNQ, the XSN2J-1 first flew on 15 February 1947, two aircraft being evaluated by the Navy. Neither aircraft were considered satisfactory in evaluations; in addition, restrictions on the Navy's budget meant that the aircraft could not be ordered at the time, and the program was cancelled in 1948. The similar T-28 Trojan would later be ordered to fill the Navy's requirement for a new trainer.

Specifications

See also

References

 Bridges, Derek. SN - Scout Trainer Aircraft, U.S. Military Aircraft and Weapon Designations.
 
 Silich, Rob. "North American Aviation T-28 Trojan: The Last Great Warbird?" KiwiFlyer Issue 6. New Zealand Warbirds Association.

External links

 North American XSN2J-1, Ed Coates Collection.
 
 https://web.archive.org/web/20081207004318/http://www.scramble.nl/wiki/index.php?title=North_American%2FDesignations
 

SN2J
North American SN2J
Single-engined tractor aircraft
Low-wing aircraft
Carrier-based aircraft
Aircraft first flown in 1947